Sandor Posta (25 September 1888 – 4 November 1952) was a Hungarian fencer and Olympic champion in the sabre competition.

Sandor Posta's early fencing career was interrupted by service in the First World War. During fighting in the trenches he sustained a serious hip injury which threatened his sporting career. Following an operation in Vienna he was able to return to the sport. He was very superstitious and would not talk to anyone directly before or after a fight. His statement to the press following his Olympic win was slid under a hotel room door on the journalist's calling card.

He received a gold medal in sabre individual at the 1924 Summer Olympics in Paris, and a silver medal in team (sabre). He was also a member of the Hungarian team that received a bronze medal in foil team in the 1924 Olympics.

Following his Olympic victory he worked as a dentist and sports journalist. He served briefly as the Deputy People's Comissar of Health for the Republic of Hungary.

References

1888 births
1952 deaths
Hungarian male foil fencers
Hungarian male sabre fencers
Olympic fencers of Hungary
Fencers at the 1924 Summer Olympics
Olympic gold medalists for Hungary
Olympic silver medalists for Hungary
Olympic bronze medalists for Hungary
Olympic medalists in fencing
Medalists at the 1924 Summer Olympics